Pogali, or Poguli, is an Indo-Aryan language spoken in parts of the Chenab Valley in Jammu region of Jammu and Kashmir, India. Its area encompasses the Pogal and Paristan, Ramsu Banihal Khari Reasi valleys, and currently falls within the boundaries of Ramban district's Pogal Paristan tehsil. Like its neighbours Sarazi and Rambani, Poguli is intermediate between Kahsmiri and Western Pahari.

References

Bibliography 

Indo-Aryan languages
Languages of Jammu and Kashmir